Thoracochaeta is a genus of flies belonging to the family lesser dung flies.

Species
T. accola Roháček & Marshall, 2000
T. acinaces Roháček & Marshall, 2000
T. alia Marshall & Roháček, 2000
T. ancudensis (Richards, 1931)
T. arnaudi (Richards, 1963)
T. bajaminuta (Marshall, 1982)
T. brachystoma (Stenhammar, 1855)
T. calminuta (Marshall, 1982)
T. cercalis Roháček & Marshall, 2000
T. conglobata Marshall & Roháček, 2000
T. cubita Marshall & Norrbom, 1985
T. erectiseta Carles-Tolrá, 1994
T. falx Marshall & Roháček, 2000
T. flaminuta (Marshall, 1982)
T. gemina Roháček & Marshall, 2000
T. harrisoni Marshall & Roháček, 2000
T. hirsutimera Marshall & Roháček, 2000
T. imitatrix Marshall & Roháček, 2000
T. johnsoni (Spuler, 1925)
T. lanx Roháček & Marshall, 2000
T. mediterranea Munari, 1989
T. miranda Roháček & Marshall, 2000
T. mucronata Marshall & Roháček, 2000
T. neofucicola Marshall & Roháček, 2000
T. pauliani (Séguy, 1954)
T. peculiaris (Richards, 1973)
T. pertica Marshall & Roháček, 2000
T. pugillaris Marshall & Roháček, 2000
T. securis Marshall & Roháček, 2000
T. seticosta (Spuler, 1925)
T. setifer Hayashi, 2005
T. teskeyi (Marshall, 1982)
T. valentinei Roháček & Marshall, 2000
T. zealandica (Harrison, 1959)
T. zosterae (Haliday, 1833)

References

Sphaeroceridae
Diptera of Africa
Diptera of Asia
Diptera of North America
Diptera of Europe
Diptera of Australasia
Brachycera genera
Taxa named by Oswald Duda